An illiberal democracy describes a governing system in which, although elections take place, citizens are cut off from knowledge about the activities of those who exercise real power because of the lack of civil liberties; thus it does not constitute an open society.

The rulers of an illiberal democracy may ignore or bypass constitutional limits on their power. They also tend to ignore the will of the minority which is what makes the democracy illiberal. Elections in an illiberal democracy are often manipulated or rigged, being used to legitimize and consolidate the incumbent rather than to choose the country's leaders and policies.

Some theorists say that illiberal democracy is a fundamentally undemocratic hybrid regime and therefore prefer terms such as electoral authoritarianism, competitive authoritarianism, or soft authoritarianism.

Origin and description 
The term and concept of illiberal democracy derive from the 1995-book Towards Illiberal Democracy in Pacific Asia by Daniel A. Bell, David Brown, Kanishka Jayasuriya, and David Martin Jones. Challenging Francis Fukuyamaʼs end-of-history thesis that political history was culminating in the global rule of capitalist liberal democracy, the book countered that Pacific Asia was not converging on liberal democracy but had instead taken an illiberal turn. Political philosopher Daniel A. Bell contributed a chapter on Confucianism as offering an alternative, illiberal approach to democracy.

The term illiberal democracy was then used and popularized by Fareed Zakaria in a regularly cited 1997 article in the journal Foreign Affairs. According to Zakaria, illiberal democracies are increasing around the world and are increasingly limiting the freedoms of the people they represent.  Zakaria points out that in the West, electoral democracy and civil liberties (of speech, religion, etc.) go hand in hand. But around the world, the two concepts are coming apart. He says that democracy without constitutional liberalism is producing centralized regimes, the erosion of liberty, ethnic competition, conflict, and war. Recent scholarship has addressed why elections, institutions commonly associated with liberalism and freedom, have led to such negative outcomes in illiberal democracies. Hybrid regimes are political systems in which the mechanism for determining access to state office combines both democratic and autocratic practices. In hybrid regimes, freedoms exist and the opposition is allowed to legally compete in elections, but the system of checks and balances becomes inoperative.

Regime type is important for illiberal democracies. This is because illiberal democracies can rise from both consolidated liberal democracies and authoritarian states. Zakaria initially wrote his paper using the term illiberal democracy interchangeably with pseudo-autocracies but today they are used to describe countries that are potentially democratically backsliding as well. Below it is explained how illiberal democracies—in this case autocratic regimes—may try to demonstrate false liberal tendencies in order to consolidate their regime. 

According to Maureen Lauruelle, there are "significant differences between illiberalism and conservatism" as it has been "traditionally understood"

Author Jennifer Gandhi says that many autocrats allow elections in their governance to stabilize and reinforce their regimes. She first says that elections help leaders resolve threats from elites and from the masses by appeasing those capable of usurping power with money and securing the cooperation of the general public with political concessions. Gandhi also claims that illiberal elections serve other useful purposes, such as providing autocrats with information about their citizens and establishing legitimacy both domestically and in the international community, and that these varied functions must be elucidated in future research. One example of the regime durability provided by illiberal democracy is illustrated in Mubarak's Egyptian regime. Lisa Blaydes shows that under Mubarak's lengthy rule, elections provided a mechanism through which elites bought votes to support the government (through distributing needed goods and resources to the public) to acquire regime-enforced parliamentary immunity. This enabled them to accumulate illicit wealth and draw from state resources without legal consequence. Such research suggests that, given the stability-providing function of illiberal elections, states governed under illiberal democracies may have low prospects for a transition to a democratic system protected by constitutional liberties.

In order to discourage this problem and promote the development of liberal democracies with free and fair elections, Zakaria proposes that the international community and the United States must promote gradual liberalization of societies. Zakaria advances institutions like the World Trade Organization, the Federal Reserve System, and a check on power in the form of the judiciary to promote democracy and limit the power of people which can be destructive. Illiberal democratic governments may believe they have a mandate to act in any way they see fit as long as they hold regular elections. Lack of liberties such as freedom of speech and freedom of assembly make opposition extremely difficult. The rulers may centralize powers between branches of the central government and local government (exhibiting no separation of powers). Media are often controlled by the state and strongly support the regime. Non-governmental organizations may face onerous regulations or simply be prohibited. The regime may use red tape, economic pressure, imprisonment or violence against its critics. Zakaria believes that constitutional liberalism can bring democracy, but not vice versa.

Types 
There is a spectrum of illiberal democracies: from those that are nearly liberal democracies to those that are almost openly dictatorships. One proposed method of determining whether a regime is an illiberal democracy is to determine whether "it has regular, free, fair, and competitive elections to fill the principal positions of power in the country, but it does not qualify as Free in Freedom House's annual ratings of civil liberties and political rights." A 2008 article by Rocha Menocal, Fritz and Rakner describes the emergence of illiberal democracies and discusses some of their shared characteristics. Menocal, Fritz, and Rakner try to draw the similarity between illiberal democracies and hybrid regimes. The authors make the case that the "democratic optimism" in the 1990s—following the collapse of the Soviet Union—has led to the emergence of hybrid regimes holding illiberal values. Initially, the Western powers assumed that democratic consolidation would occur automatically and disregarded the alternatives. In reality, the non-consolidation of democracy has led to the rise of hybrid regimes that possess "illiberal values".

Cases of illiberalism 
In a 2014 speech, after winning re-election for the first time, Viktor Orbán, Prime Minister of Hungary described his views about the future of Hungary as an "illiberal state". In his interpretation the "illiberal state" does not reject the values of the liberal democracy, but does not adopt it as a central element of state organisation. Orbán listed Singapore, Russia, Turkey, and China as examples of "successful" nations, "none of which is liberal and some of which aren’t even democracies."

Indian-American journalist Fareed Zakaria claimed that India was the largest illiberal democracy in the world, in his book The Future of Freedom: Illiberal Democracy at Home and Abroad.

In a 2015 CNN reportage, Zakaria said that Turkey under Recep Tayyip Erdoğan had become a textbook case of illiberal democracy. Erik Meyersson observed that using Freedom House’s measure of liberty, Turkey took the last place among electoral democracies in 2015, scoring worse on the liberty measure than some countries that are not even considered electoral democracies. 

Since 2016, the Philippines under presidents Rodrigo Duterte and Bongbong Marcos has been described as being in an illilberal democracy. It has been described as a worldwide capital and stronghold of illiberalism culturally and politically. 

In the United States, the Republican Party has in recent years faced criticism that it is becoming increasingly illiberal under the leadership of former President Donald Trump. According to a study by the V-Dem Institute, the Republican Party has become more illiberal and populist in the last decade with a large increase under the leadership of Donald Trump. Trump's populist style of governance has been considered by some to be a dangerous risk to the heart of liberal democracy, as well an indifference towards traditional democratic allies and praising other "strongman rulers" in the world like Putin.

Relationship with populism 
With the different types and different examples of illustrations discussed, a key component in the rise of illiberal democracies today is populism. Current populist leaders—especially within Western states—have the tendency to promote illiberal values, a notable example being the exclusion of immigrants and openly xenophobic statements. This wave has been labeled as "xenophobic populism".

Authors Cas Mudde and Cristóbal Rovira Kaltwasser discuss the role of populism in deteriorating liberal democracies. Within the article, Mudde and Kaltwasser say that populism—although surrounded by negative connotations—is democratic in nature, as it gives a voice to the people and heavily follows the idea of majoritarian rule. The problem arises within liberal democracies, as the authors say that liberal values and democracy internally contradict each other. Democracy promises majoritarian rule while liberal values promise the protection of minorities. Furthermore, it is said that populism is a product of democracy, but in general populist leaders try to use the democratic aspect of liberal democracies to undermine liberalism. This is closely related to Zakaria's argument. The authors try to establish the idea that the rise of populism is undermining liberal values as populism at its core rejects plurality and minority protection—often the evident liberal values.

Moreover, Sheri Berman supports that idea that democracy being unchecked by liberalism can lead to populist—and in some regards dangerous—rule, but further says that liberal values unchecked by democracy can be just as dangerous, as she says, through the use of historical examples, this can lead to oligarchic rule. Berman takes a different perspective on the role of populism and says that it is rather the weakening of democratic institutions that has led to the rise of populism and the deterioration of liberal democracies. When discussing this matter, Berman through the example of Western states—United States and Europe—has attributed the cause of populist backlash to national government disregarding the interests of average citizens for business elites. In sum, Berman is trying to demonstrate that populism has led to the rise of illiberal democracies, while the populism has gained traction as a result in democratic institutions being too elite-led.

Criticism 
Writers such as Steven Levitsky and Lucan Way reject the concept of an illiberal democracy, saying it only "muddies the waters" on the basis that if a country does not have opposition parties and an independent media, it is not democratic. They say that terms like "illiberal democracy" are inappropriate for some of these states because the term implies that these regimes are at their heart democracies that have gone wrong. Levitsky and Way say that states such as the Federal Republic of Yugoslavia under Slobodan Milošević, Zimbabwe and post-Soviet Russia were never truly democratic and not developing toward democracy, but were rather tending toward authoritarian behavior despite having elections, which were sometimes sharply contested. Thus, Levitsky and Way coined a new term to remove the positive connotation of democracy from these states and distinguish them from flawed or developing democracies: competitive authoritarianism.

According to Wojciech Sadurski, "illiberal democracy is largely an oxymoron" in Poland, because "[b]y dismantling various checks and balances, and the many democratic institutions related to elections and judicial review, the ruling party greatly weakens the democratic character of the state". Sadurski prefers the term "plebiscitarian authoritarianism".

In 1998, author Marc Plattner said that democracy and liberalism have a turbulent relationship, where throughout history they constantly repel and attract one another. Plattner believes that the rise of illiberal democracies is merely part of a democratization cycle, where states democratizing will often shift from liberal to illiberal tendencies. From this, Plattner believes that through the careful assistance of consolidated democracies these 'illiberal democracies' can slowly push themselves out of this cycle.

According to a study by George Washington University political scientist Michael K. Miller, multiparty autocratic elections predict significantly better outcomes on health, education, gender equality, and basic freedoms relative to non-electoral autocracy. Effects on health and education are as strong as those of democracy and are significantly better than in non-electoral autocracy.

See also 

 Authoritarian democracy
 Authoritarian capitalism
 Authoritarianism
 Criticism of democracy
 Democratic backsliding
 Defective democracy
 Dictablanda
 Dominant-party system
 Guided democracy
 Herrenvolk democracy
 Hybrid regime
 Inverted totalitarianism
 Liberal autocracy
 Political corruption
 Representative democracy
 Ruscism
 Semi-authoritarian
 Soft despotism
 State within a state
 Totalitarian democracy

References

Further reading 

 Bell, Daniel; Brown, David, and Jayasuriya, Kanishka (1995). Towards Illiberal Democracy in Pacific Asia, St. Martin's Press, .

 Thomas, Nicholas (1999). Democracy Denied: Identity, Civil Society, and Illiberal Democracy in Hong Kong, Ashgate, .
 Welsh, Jennifer (2016). "Chapter 4: The Return of Cold War". The Return of History: Conflict, Migration, and Geopolitics in the Twenty-First Century. House of Anansi Press. .
 Zakaria, Fareed (2007). The Future of Freedom: Illiberal Democracy at Home and Abroad, W. W. Norton & Company, .

Political systems
1997 introductions
Types of democracy